Paulhaguet is a commune in the Haute-Loire department in south-central France.

Geography
The Senouire flows northwest through the southern part of the commune, crosses the town, then flows north through the commune.

Population

Popular culture
Certain scenes from the 1995 romantic comedy "French Kiss", starring Meg Ryan and Kevin Kline, were filmed there, as well as in nearby La Ravelle.

See also
Communes of the Haute-Loire department

References

Communes of Haute-Loire